Rusty Kruger (born March 26, 1975) is a Canadian retired lacrosse player in the National Lacrosse League and a current assistant coach with the Buffalo Bandits.

Statistics

NLL
Reference:

References

1975 births
Buffalo Bandits players
Canadian lacrosse players
Chicago Shamrox players
Lacrosse people from Ontario
Living people
People from Orangeville, Ontario
Rochester Knighthawks players
San Jose Stealth players
Toronto Rock players
New York Saints players
Albany Attack players
National Lacrosse League coaches
National Lacrosse League players
Buffalo Bandits coaches
Lacrosse forwards